Carl Gustaf von Nieroth (died 1712) was a Swedish officer and Governor-General of Swedish Estonia 1709–1710 (though not formally installed) and of Finland 1710–1712. 

The exact date and location of his birth are unknown, but believed to be in Finland. He was a son of the Baltic German Otto Nieroth and Gertrud Baranoff. He was first recorded in 1671 as a cornet of the Swedish Army in Swedish Pomerania. In 1692 he had risen to the rank of lieutenant colonel, in 1700 to major general and in 1704 to lieutenant general. 

During the Great Northern War Nieroth was involved in several successful battles, the Battle of Warsaw (1705) being his greatest success. 

After Viborg was lost  in 1710, Nieroth was sent to try to reclaim it. He assembled 10,000 men, who besieged the city in 1711 but lacked equipment to enter it, and had to retreat. He died suddenly during a temporary halt in Sarvlax manor in Pernå parish, on 25 January 1712.

He was married on 7 January 1686 in Stockholm to Christina Margareta Horn (d. 17 September 1703).

He was elevated to friherre and count on 26 June 1706.

References

External links 
  article Nieroth, Karl in Nordisk Familjebok (1913).
  article Nieroth, Carl in Svenskt biografiskt handlexikon (1906).

|-

Date of birth unknown
1712 deaths
Swedish nobility
18th-century Swedish military personnel
18th-century Estonian people
18th-century Finnish people
Caroleans
Swedish Governors-General of Finland